Christopher David James Dent (born 20 January 1991) is an English cricketer. He is a left-handed batsman who plays for Gloucestershire. He was born in Bristol.

Career
Dent played for Gloucestershire at Under-15 and Under-17 level as a member of their academy squad, while playing club cricket for Thornbury in the West of England Premier League. Dent played for the Gloucestershire Second XI from 2007, before signing his first professional contract with the club in August 2009.

Dent made his List A début in September 2009, against Nottinghamshire. He did not bat or bowl in the match, as Gloucestershire reached their winning target of 58 runs with nine wickets to spare.

In 2009 Dent was selected for the England Under-19 tour of Bangladesh, and in January 2010 was a member of the England squad at the Under 19 Cricket World Cup.

Dent played in nearly all of Gloucestershire's games for 2013, averaging 45.12 with the bat scoring a total of 1,128 runs, the first time he had scored 1000 runs in a season.

At the start of the 2018 season, Dent was appointed club captain for both the County Championship and the One Day Cup competitions.

In April 2022, in the 2022 County Championship, Dent scored his 10,000th run in first-class cricket.

Career best performances
as of 4 September 2020

References

External links
 
 Player Profile: Chris Dent from Gloucestershire County Cricket Club

1991 births
Living people
English cricket captains 
Gloucestershire cricket captains 
English cricketers
Gloucestershire cricketers
Cricketers from Bristol